The Ilim is a river in Irkutsk Oblast in Russia, a right tributary of the Angara.

Geography 
The Ust-Ilimsk Dam on the Angara (downstream from the older, bigger, and better known  Bratsk Dam), completed in the mid-1970s, not only backs up the Angara, but also the Ilim as far as Zheleznogorsk-Ilimsky. The site of the old town of Ilimsk was flooded by the reservoir.

The river freezes up in late October and stays icebound until early May. Its main tributaries are the Kochenga and the Tuba from the right, and the Chora from the left.

See also

Siberian River Routes

References

Rivers of Irkutsk Oblast